Umurah Salaam is a Maldivian romantic drama television series developed for Television Maldives by Fathimath Nahula and Mohamed Faisal. The series stars Mohamed Faisal, Aminath Rishfa and Mariyam Azza in pivotal roles.

Premise
Ashraf (Mohamed Faisal), an honest businessman, plans to marry Shazly (Mariyam Azza), an orphan, despite his wicked half-sister, Nashidha (Fathimath Mufliha) and equally villainous, step-mother's (Mariyam Haleem) disapproval. Fayaz (Ahmed Azmeel), a carefree young man, married to an elder woman, Nashidha, is involved in an extra-marital affair with a friend of Shazly, Fareesha (Sujeetha Abdulla). Fayaz and Fareesha marry on the same night of Ashraf and Shazly's wedding. The following day Ashraf's father, Saud (Roanu Hassan Manik) is found to be dead lying on bed. Although the doctors mention the reason for death as a heart attack, both Ashraf and Fayaz suspect he might have been murdered on the night of their weddings. Meanwhile, Nashidha's younger brother, Fazil (Ahmed Aman) confesses his love for the servant working in their house, an orphan, Maasha (Mariyam Majudha) which disgusts both Nashidha and her mother.

Cast and characters

Main
 Mohamed Faisal as Ashraf
 Aminath Rishfa as Reesha
 Mariyam Azza as Shazly
 Ahmed Azmeel as Fayaz
 Mariyam Haleem as Nashidha's mother
 Fathimath Mufliha as Nashidha

Recurring
 Roanu Hassan Manik as Saud; Ashraf's father (3 episodes)
 Mariyam Majudha as Maasha
 Ahmed Aman as Fazil
 Sujeetha Abdulla as Fareesha
 Abdulla Mahir as Shahudhee

Soundtrack

References

Serial drama television series
Maldivian television shows